Patricia Grace Devine is a professor of psychology at the University of Wisconsin–Madison, where she was the psychology department chair from 2009 to 2014. She was also the 2012 president of the Society for Personality and Social Psychology.

She is an experimental social psychologist who specializes in prejudice, stereotypes, and intergroup relations. She received her PhD in social psychology from Ohio State University in 1986.

Major Contributions
Devine's 1989 study, Stereotypes and prejudice: Their automatic and controlled components, received the prestigious Scientific Impact Award from the Society of Experimental Social Psychology, recognizing her paper's lasting impact that fundamentally altered the landscape of prejudice and stereotyping research. Her paper demonstrated that stereotypes and prejudicial emotions can be activated automatically, in opposition to one's explicit, controlled beliefs. This insight has spurred four decades of research on the automaticity and control of prejudice.

In 2012, she developed a prejudice intervention that taught participants cognitive techniques to overcome non-intentional race bias, which was able to reduce implicit bias up to two months after the intervention.

Publications
 The Role of Discrepancy-Associated Affect in Prejudice Reduction Co-Author: Margo J. Monteith  
 Intuitive versus Rational Judgment and the Role of Stereotyping in the Human Condition: Kirk or Spock? Co-Author: Steven J. Sherman  
 Stereotypes and Prejudice: Their Automatic and Controlled Components  
 Overattribution Effect: The Role of Confidence and Attributional Complexity  
 Prejudice and Outgroup Perception 
 Getting Hooked on Research in Social Psychology: Examples from Eyewitness Identification and Prejudice
 Diagnostic and Confirmation Strategies in Trait Hypothesis Testing Co-Authors: Edward R. Hirt and Elizabeth M. Gehrke  
 Prejudice With and Without Compunction Co-Authors: Margo J. Monteith, Julia R. Zuwerink and Andre J. Elliot  
 Goals in Social Information Processing: The Case of Anticipated Interaction Co-Authors: Constantine Sedikides and Robert W. Fuhrman

Recent publications
Devine, together with William T. L. Cox, Lyn Abramson and Steven Hollon, recently proposed the integrated perspective on prejudice and depression, which unites cognitive theories of depression with theories of prejudice, casting them in a common terminology and identifying ways that depression research can inform prejudice research and vice versa.

Devine, along with William T. L. Cox, Alyssa Bischmann, and Janet Hyde at the University of Wisconsin-Madison, have suggested that “gaydar” is an alternate label for using stereotypes to infer orientation (e.g., inferring that fashionable men are gay) (2015). These studies have revealed that orientation is not visible from the face—participants did, however, readily infer orientation from stereotypic attributes (e.g., fashion, career). Compared to a control group, people stereotyped more when led to believe in gaydar, whereas people stereotyped less when told gaydar is an alternate label for stereotyping.  It was concluded that “gaydar” serves as a legitimizing myth that disguises and perpetuates stereotyping.

References

External links
Patricia Devine – UW-Madison Department of Psychology
Trish Devine – Social Psychology Network Profile
Devine Intergroup Relations Lab Official Page

Living people
University of Wisconsin–Madison faculty
Year of birth missing (living people)